The Corner Conference is a high school athletic conference based in Southwestern Iowa. All members are in Class 1A (the smallest schools in Iowa).

Members

<small>* Essex and Stanton compete together in football as Stanton/Essex

History
 In 1953, original 6 members Farragut, Sidney, Hamburg, Essex, Malvern, and Tabor form the Corner Conference. 
 In 1959, Tabor merged with Bartlett, Randolph, and Thurman to become Fremont–Mills. New Market and South Page join, membership is at 8.
 In 1960, Stanton joins from the Tri-County Conference to make membership 9.
 In 1961, Nishna Valley joins from the Mills County Conference; 10 schools.
 In 1987, Carson-Macedonia joins from the Rolling Hills Conference; 11 schools.
 In 1988, Villisca joins from the Tall Corn Conference; membership is at 12 schools.
 In 1989, New Market closed its high school, dropping membership to 11.
 In 1992, Bedford joins from the Tall Corn Conference, bringing membership back up to 12.
 In 1993, Carson-Macedonia merged with Oakland to become Riverside Community School District, and left to join the Western Iowa Conference. Membership is 11.
 In 2000, Bedford then left the Corner Conference for the Pride of Iowa Conference. Membership drops to 10.
 In 2004, Clarinda Academy joined, bringing membership up to 11.
 In 2007, Malvern entered sports sharing with Nishna Valley, known as "East Mills", which stays in the conference. Membership is at 10.
 In 2010, Farragut and Hamburg entered sports sharing, known as "Nishnabotna". The new team stays in the conference, bringing membership down to 9.
 In 2011, Heartland Christian joined, bringing membership back up to 10, although for some sports they pair with St. Albert's in the Hawkeye 10 Conference. The co-op of Malvern and Nishna Valley known as "East Mills" is officially reorganized into one single school district with the same name.
 In 2012, "Nishnabotna" schools Farragut and Hamburg enter official whole-grade sharing. There had been discussions with Sidney to eventually form a three school sharing agreement, but did not happen.
 In 2013, Villisca entered whole-grade sharing with Pride of Iowa Conference member Corning, to be known as Southwest Valley, and would compete in the Pride of Iowa Conference. Membership drops to 9.
 In 2016, the Farragut-Hamburg partnership known as "Nishnabotna" was dissolved; the entire Farragut school district was forcibly shut down by the state, and Hamburg closed its high school. Membership drops to 8.
 In 2018, Griswold School joined to bring membership up to 9. 
 In 2019, South Page ceased independent athletic teams at the end of the year and was essentially absorbed by Clarinda. Membership drops to 8.
 In 2020, Heartland Christian left for The Frontier Conference of Nebraska. Membership is now at 7.
 In 2021, Clarinda Academy was closed. Membership drops to 6.

References

External links
 Official site

High school sports in Iowa
1954 establishments in Iowa
Sports leagues established in 1954